Roby Schaeffer (7 November 1930 – 23 April 2014) was a Luxembourgian sprinter. He competed in the men's 200 metres at the 1952 Summer Olympics.

References

1930 births
2014 deaths
Athletes (track and field) at the 1952 Summer Olympics
Luxembourgian male sprinters
Olympic athletes of Luxembourg
Place of birth missing